Star Tannery is an unincorporated community in southwestern Frederick County, Virginia on the Shenandoah County line. Star Tannery is located on Star Tannery Road (State Route 604) off Wardensville Pike (State Route 55) along Cedar Creek. The Zip Code for Star Tannery is 22654.

References

Unincorporated communities in Frederick County, Virginia
Unincorporated communities in Virginia